Three destroyers of Japan were named Nagatsuki:

 , a  launched in 1906 and stricken in 1930
 , a  launched in 1926 and sunk in 1943
 , a  launched in 1969 and expended as a target in 1998

Imperial Japanese Navy ship names
Japanese Navy ship names